Washington Improv Theater (WIT) is an improvisational comedy theater company in Washington, D.C., specializing in long-form improv. It was founded in 1986 by Carole Douglis. Its shows are based primary out of the former venue of the Source Theatre Company on the 14th Street corridor, although its teams also use several other venues. Roughly 20,000 people attend WIT shows annually.

History

WIT was founded in 1986 by Carole Douglis, but it went dormant in 1992. It was revived by Douglis and several others as a consensus-based collective in 1998, and performed initially in the basement of the Universalist National Memorial Church, and soon after other venues around D.C. It began offering its own improv training program in 2000. In 2004, it hired its first full-time artistic and executive director, Mark Chalfant. In 2008, it began performing at the 150-seat black box at Source Theater on 14th Street, the former venue of Source Theatre Company now operated by CultureDC. It has continued expanding since then, and in FY2019 hosted 325 performances with an estimated 20,590 attendees.

Activities
WIT hosts over 300 performances annually featuring a number of different in-house ensembles and visiting teams. Its performances have received favorable reviews from critics. They vary in form — for instance, iMusical is an improvised musical.

WIT's Tuesday evening pay-what-you-can Harold Night performances, begun in April 2010, feature four teams each performing half-hour harold sets. WIT also hosts an annual improv marathon festival, Improvalooza, a March madness-style competition, dubbed the Fighting Improv Smackdown Tournament, and performances or lessons at various other venues, such as local schools and the Kennedy Center.

WIT's improv classes enrolled 1,728 students in FY2019 across a five-level curriculum.

WIT runs a program for corporate clients, "WIT at Work". In 2019, the program worked with 79 clients with a total of 2900 participants.

Notable performers 
 Natasha Rothwell
 Aparna Nancherla

References

External links
 

Arts organizations established in 1986
Theatre companies in Washington, D.C.
1986 establishments in Washington, D.C.
Theatres in Washington, D.C.
League of Washington Theatres
Improvisational theatre
Members of the Cultural Alliance of Greater Washington